Alton "Al" Baldwin (February 21, 1923 – May 23, 1994) was a professional American football end/defensive back who played in the All-America Football Conference, the National Football League and the Canadian Football League.

In his senior season as an End for the 1946 Arkansas Razorbacks football team, Baldwin helped Arkansas win a share of the Southwest Conference championship, and played the LSU Tigers to a 0-0 tie in the 1947 Cotton Bowl Classic. Baldwin was given 1st team All-SWC honors for his play that season. It was the first season for new head coach John Barnhill, and his teammate Clyde Scott would eventually be inducted into the College Football Hall of Fame. 

He died from a stroke on May 23, 1994.

External links

 

1923 births
1994 deaths
Sportspeople from Hot Springs, Arkansas
Players of American football from Arkansas
American players of Canadian football
American football tight ends
Arkansas Razorbacks football players
Arkansas Razorbacks men's track and field athletes
Buffalo Bills (AAFC) players
Green Bay Packers players
Canadian football ends
Ottawa Rough Riders players
Hamilton Tiger-Cats players